WOW Cinema One is a Hindi-language 24/7 Movie television channel, owned by Cinema 24X7 PVT LTD. The channel is a free-to-air and launched on 1 June 2015.

References

Hindi-language television channels in India
Television channels and stations established in 2015
Hindi-language television stations
Television stations in New Delhi
2015 establishments in Delhi

Movie channels in India